Heat shock 70kDa protein 7 (HSP70B) also known as HSPA7 is a human gene.  The protein encoded by this gene is a member of the Hsp70 family of heat shock proteins.

References

External links 
 

Heat shock proteins